Is This Room Getting Smaller is the debut studio album by the California rock music group Onesidezero. The album was released on November 20, 2001 via Maverick Records.

Reception and legacy

VH1 listed Is This Room Getting Smaller as one of 12 "underrated nu metal albums". In 2006, Swedish singer Lisa Miskovsky recorded a cover of the song "Instead Laugh".

Track listing

Personnel
 Jasan Radford — vocals, guitar
 Levon Sultanian — lead guitar, backing vocals 
 Brett Kane — rhythm guitar, backing vocals
 Cristian Hernandez — bass, backing vocals
 Rob Basile — drums

References

2001 debut albums
Maverick Records albums
Onesidezero albums